The January 2015 Mazraat Amal incident was an airstrike against a two-car convoy that killed six Hezbollah fighters, including two prominent commanders, and a general of the Iranian Revolutionary Guards (IRGC), Mohammad Ali Allahdadi, at al-Amal Farms (Mazraat Amal) in the Quneitra District of Syria, in the Eastern Golan Heights, on 18 January 2015, during the Syrian Civil War. The attack was largely attributed to Israel, which did not officially confirm that it carried it out, as usual. Hezbollah and IRGC held Israel responsible and threatened to retaliate. On 19 January 2015, Al-Nusra Front member Abu Azzam al-Idlibi claimed that Jihad Mughniyeh and the other Hezbollah fighters were killed in an Al-Nusra Front ambush at Jaroud in the Qalamoun Mountains in the Al-Qutayfah District northeast of Damascus, claiming that it "will be the end of the Persian project, God willing."

Ten days later, Hezbollah launched an ambush against an Israeli military convoy in Shebaa Farms, which was seen by many sources as a retaliatory action.

Background
Since the beginning of 2013, Hezbollah fighters have operated openly and in significant numbers across the border alongside their Syrian and Iraqi counterparts. They have enabled the Syrian government to regain control of rebel-held areas in central Syria and have improved the effectiveness of pro-government forces. Since 2013 Hezbollah has been pitted against al Qaeda-linked jihadists who have flocked to Syria from across the Muslim world.

The attack
Residents of al-Amal Farms said that two cars arrived there, and within ten minutes two aircraft fired two missiles on each car. The resulting explosions left charred tires, molten metal, and car parts were strewn about. One local was struck in the head by shrapnel and taken to hospital. Hezbollah said that one of their vehicles was destroyed and another damaged. Reports prior to the United Nations statement suggested an attack by an Israeli helicopter, but the later reports indicated it may have been by drones.

A United Nations spokesman reported that the United Nations Disengagement Observer Force (UNDOF) observed two unmanned aerial vehicles (drones) flying from Israeli-occupied Western Golan and crossing the Area of Separation buffer zone towards UN position 30 on the Syrian controlled edge of the zone, where they lost track of them. An hour later they saw smoke coming from position 30 but could not identify the source. Later they observed drones coming from the area of position 30 and flying over Jabbata, in the Area of Separation. The spokesman stated that this was a violation of the 1974 Agreement on Disengagement between Israel and Syria.

Amid official silence, a flurry of statements from anonymous Israeli officials has made contradictory claims. One said Israel had been unaware that an Iranian general was in the convoy. Another anonymous senior Israeli security source said Israel believed it was attacking only low-ranking Hezbollah militants planning an attack on Israelis at the frontier fence, and that it had no idea the party contained prominent Hezbollah members, and least of all an Iranian general. Alex Fishman wrote in Israel's Yedioth Ahronoth that "one official apologizes anonymously, the other official refuses to apologize anonymously. ... We are talking about a potential war and the heads of the state are playing hide and seek."

Casualties
Seven people were named as being killed. The Hezbollah members were field commander Mohamad Issa, also known as Abu Issa, "Jawad" Jihad Mughniyah (son of former top Hezbollah commander Imad Mughniyeh), "Sayyed Abbas" Abbas Ibrahim Hijazi, "Kazem" Mohammed Ali Hassan Abu al-Hassan, "Daniel" Ghazi Ali Dawi, and "Ihab" Ali Hassan Ibrahim. The Iranian was Brigadier General Mohammad Ali Allahdadi (also spelt Allah Dadi), a member of the Quds Force of the Iranian Revolutionary Guard Corps, who was deployed to Syria to assist the Syrian government against the rebels in the civil war. Hezbollah's Al-Manar news channel said that the attack occurred during a "field reconnaissance mission" by Hezbollah. According to Israeli sources, Jihad Mughniyeh was believed to have been in the planning stages of "deadly terrorist attacks" against Israel in the Golan Heights, which would have included rockets, cross-border infiltrations, border bombings, and anti-tank fire, designed to kill IDF soldiers and Israeli civilians who live in the Golan.

Mohamad Issa was a 42-year-old from Arab Salim in the Nabatieh District of southern Lebanon. His father was Syrian and his mother Lebanese. He joined Hezbollah by the age of 15, and rose through the ranks and took a leadership in many battles with Israel, including the 2006 Lebanon War. He was said to be leading Hezbollah's operations in the Golan at the time of his death and was the only one officially identified by Hezbollah as a commander.

Jihad Mughniyah was 25 years old and a rising figure within Hezbollah. His father was top Hezbollah commander Imad Mughniyeh, who was assassinated by a car bombing in Damascus in 2008. His fathers' two brothers, one also named Jihad, were killed in car bombings in 1985 and 1994. His father had close ties to Iran and was said to report to Qasem Soleimani, the commander of the Quds Force. Soleimani was very close to Jihad Mughniyah after his father was killed, and reportedly adopted him as his son. Mughniyeh was close to Mustafa Badr Al Din, the military leader of Hezbollah and brother-in-law of his father. Mughniyeh also had a close personal connection to Hezbollah leader Hassan Nasrallah. With his high-level personal connections with Iran and within Hezbollah, and the status of his father, Mughniyeh was known as "the prince" in Hezbollah, and many expected him to quickly rise within the organization to a position similar to that of his father. After Syrian rebels captured Tal al-Hara and seized documents in October 2014, a Syrian National Council spokesman said that Mughniyeh was serving as Hezbollah's Golan District commander.

Abbas Ibrahim Hijazi was a 35-year-old from Ghazieh in the Sidon District of southern Lebanon. His father, known as Abu Kamal, was a founding member of Hezbollah. Hijazi had been involved in the 2006 war and had fought with Hezbollah against Syrian rebels in Qusayr and Yabroud in Syria in 2014. He was married to a daughter of Abu Hasan Salameh, a Hezbollah commander killed by the Israelis in 1999. Mohammad Ali Hassan Abu al-Hasan was 29 and was from Ain Qana. Ghazi Ali Dawi was 26 and from Khiam. Ali Hassan Ibrahim was 21 and from Yahmar al Shaqif.

Escalation
On 27 January, at least two rockets from Syria hit the Israeli-controlled Western Golan Heights, and Israel responded with artillery fire.

On 28 January, Hezbollah fired an anti-tank missile at an Israeli military convoy in the Israeli-controlled Shebaa farms near the Lebanon border, killing two soldiers and wounding seven. In response, Israel fired at least 50 artillery shells across the border into southern Lebanon, in which a Spanish UN peacekeeper was killed.

Beginning in February 2015, Iranian and Hezbollah forces supported by the Syrian Government launched "Operation Martyrs of Quneitra" named after the combatants killed in the Israeli strike, with an aim of the offensive is the establishment of a Hezbollah controlled front against Israel.

Reactions
  – Defense Minister Moshe Ya'alon refused to comment on the airstrike, but noted: "If Hezbollah says their people were hurt in the targeted killing, let them explain what they were doing in Syria."
  – Iran's Supreme Leader Ali Khamenei posted on his Twitter account rare "unseen" pictures of him hugging and kissing Jihad Mughniyeh and his father, Imad. And in a stern message after the attack, Iran's Islamic Revolutionary Guard Corps (IRGC) commander Mohammad Ali Jafari reaffirmed the organization's commitment to continuing the struggle against the "Zionist regime" until its destruction. Jafari said: "[...] The martyrdom of the members of the Ummah constitutes a further springboard for the destruction of the oppressive, satanic, and terrorist political system of the Zionist regime [...] The martyrdom again proved that we must not distance ourselves from the jihad and that the Zionists must prepare themselves for the "devastating thunderbolt" of Iran. A picture of Qassem Soleimani, head of the Quds Force, praying at Mughniyeh's grave was broadcast by Lebanese television channel Al-Mayadeen. He also met Hassan Nasrullah in Beirut 48 hours after the attack.
  Hezbollah – Hezbollah reportedly called the death of Jihad Mughniyeh "an unbearable blow." Hassan Nasrallah threatened to retaliate against Israel, stating the organization has "all (the weapons) you can imagine ... and in great quantities". in a speech after the January 2015 Shebaa farms incident, he said Israel had "planned, calculated and took a premeditated decision to assassinate" the fighters. He added that those killed in the attack showed a "fusion of Lebanese-Iranian blood on Syrian soil, and reflects the unity of the cause and the unity of the fate of the countries in the Axis of Resistance."
  Al-Nusra Front – On 19 January 2015, Al-Nusra Front member Abu Azzam al-Idlibi claimed that Jihad Mughniyeh and the other Hezbollah fighters were killed in an Al-Nusra Front ambush at Jaroud in the Qalamoun Mountains in the Al-Qutayfah District northeast of Damascus, claiming that it "will be the end of the Persian project, God willing."
  – Iraq's Vice President Nouri al-Maliki offered condolences to Hezbollah Secretary General Sayyed Hasan Nasrallah and the families of the party's fighters "who were martyred in Zionist aerial aggression on Syria's Quneitra". In a letter, al-Maliki said that the martyrdom of Hezbollah fighters is considered as a great pride for them and for the Lebanese people and as a painful loss for all the honorable. "The Zionist criminals and vampires must know that the pure blood of the martyrs, like Jihad Imad Mughniyeh, will augment the resistance in face of oppression, corruption, and tyranny," the letter read. "I offer congratulations and condolences to the martyrs' families, Hezbollah glorious fighters and to you over this great martyrdom."

See also

 January 2013 Rif Dimashq airstrike
 May 2013 Rif Dimashq airstrikes
 December 2014 Rif Dimashq airstrikes
 Quneitra Governorate clashes (2012–2014)
 April 2015 Qalamoun incident

Notes

References

2015 in the Syrian civil war
January 2015 events in Syria
Military operations of the Syrian civil war in 2015
Military operations of the Syrian civil war involving Hezbollah
Hezbollah involvement in the Syrian civil war
Military operations of the Syrian civil war involving the al-Nusra Front
Quneitra Governorate in the Syrian civil war
Hezbollah–Israel conflict
Iran–Israel conflict during the Syrian civil war
Israeli involvement in the Syrian civil war
Islamic Revolutionary Guard Corps